Stelis aligera is a species of orchid plant native to Bolivia.

References 

aligera
Flora of Bolivia
Plants described in 2001